Patrick Henry Reason, first named Patrice Rison (March 17, 1816 – August 12, 1898), was one of the earliest African-American engravers and lithographers in the United States.  He was active as an abolitionist (along with his brother Charles Lewis Reason).  He was a leader in a fraternal order, gaining recognition for Hamilton Lodge No. 710, New York, as part of the Grand United Order of Odd Fellows in America.

Early life and education

Reason was born in 1816 in New York City as one of four children. His father, Michel Rison, was native to St. Anne Island, Guadeloupe, and  his mother, Elizabeth Melville, was native to Saint-Domingue, the former French colony that achieved independence as Haiti. He was baptized Patrice Rison in April 1816 at St. Peter's Catholic Church. His sister Policarpe died at age four in 1818.

With his two brothers Elver and Charles L. Reason, Patrick attended New York's African Free School.  At the age of 13, his drawing of the school building was engraved for the frontispiece of Charles C. Andrews's history of the school published in 1830.  He was apprenticed to Stephen Henry Gimber (1806–1862), an English engraver and lithographer in the city.

Career

Reason set up his own shop, where he engraved portraits and other images for anti-slavery and other books and journals, as well as for individuals.  His engravings include an 1835 version of the kneeling female slave; an 1840 portrait of United States Senator Benjamin Tappan (R-Ohio); the frontispiece portrait for the 1849 autobiography of Henry Bibb, a fugitive from slavery who became an abolitionist lecturer; and the coffin plate of Daniel Webster. An 1840 lithograph portrait of Bibb has also been attributed to Reason.

As a member of the New York Philomathean Society, Reason and others petitioned but were refused inclusion in an American fraternal organization, the Independent Order of Odd Fellows. They won recognition from the British-based Grand United Order of Odd Fellows as Philomathean Lodge No. 646 (which in turn instituted Hamilton Lodge No. 710), New York.  Reason designed the membership certificate, at one point served as the lodge's grand master, and in 1858 composed the Ruth degree, the first to be conferred upon female members.

In 1869, Reason moved with his family to Cleveland, Ohio. There he joined the firm of Sylvester Hogan, where he created jewelry and made plate engravings until his death in 1898.

Marriage and family
In 1862, Reason married Esther Cunningham (1835–1920) of Leeds, England.  Their son, Charles Lewis Reason (named for Patrick's brother), was born in 1867.  He became a doctor and practiced medicine in Cleveland, Ohio. Charles Reason died a widower in Elyria, southwest of Cleveland. He had no descendants.

References

Bibliography
Note: Many biographical sketches include factual errors about Reason's life and work. The most reliable one was written by the archivist and collector Dorothy B. Porter:
Porter, Dorothy B., "Patrick H. Reason", Dictionary of American Negro Biography, edited by Rayford W. Logan and Michael R. Winston, 1982.

1816 births
1898 deaths
Artists from New York City
American engravers
African-American abolitionists
American people of Guadeloupean descent
American people of Haitian descent
Activists from New York City
African Free School alumni
African-American printmakers
African-American Catholics